Evansburg station is on the Canadian National Railway mainline in Evansburg, Alberta, located at the east end of town near range road 75. The station is served by Via Rail's The Canadian as a flag stop (48-hour advance notice required).

References

External links 
Via Rail Station Description

Via Rail stations in Alberta
Yellowhead County
Canadian National Railway stations in Alberta